General Henry James Riddell KH (died 8 March 1861) was a British Army officer who became Commander-in-Chief, Scotland.

Military career

Riddell was commissioned in 1798 and took part in the Battle of Copenhagen in August 1807 during the Napoleonic Wars. He became a major in 50th Regiment of Foot on 12 December 1807 and transferred to the 79th Regiment of Foot on 21 April 1808. He became permanent assistant at the Quartermaster General's Department on 4 January 1810 and then went to Spain as Assistant Quartermaster General on the staff in November 1810. He was present at the crossing of the River Bidasoa in 1813.

Riddell served as Commander-in-Chief, Scotland and also as Governor of Edinburgh Castle from 1847 to 1852. He was also colonel of the 6th Regiment of Foot.

Riddell is buried in Greyfriars Kirkyard in central Edinburgh.

References

 

|-

British Army generals

1861 deaths
Burials at Greyfriars Kirkyard
British Army personnel of the Napoleonic Wars
Queen's Own Royal West Kent Regiment officers
Queen's Own Cameron Highlanders officers